Himantoglossum adriaticum, the Adriatic lizard orchid, is a species of orchid native to Italy, Slovenia, Croatia, Austria, Czech Republic and Slovakia.
It is Europe's tallest orchid, often reaching the height of 1 metre.

References

External links 

adriaticum
Orchids of Europe
Plants described in 1978